Robert Sainte-Rose (born 5 July 1943 in Fort-de-France, Martinique) is a French athlete who specialises in the men's high jump. Sainte-Rose competed at the 1964 Summer Olympics and 1968 Summer Olympics.

References 
 Sports-Reference.com

1943 births
Living people
Sportspeople from Fort-de-France
Martiniquais athletes
French male high jumpers
Olympic athletes of France
French people of Martiniquais descent
Athletes (track and field) at the 1964 Summer Olympics
Athletes (track and field) at the 1968 Summer Olympics
European Athletics Championships medalists